PR, P.R., Pr, pr, or Pr. may refer to:

Arts, entertainment, and media
 P.R. (TV series), a Canadian television sitcom
 Partisan Review, a former political and literary journal
 Perry Rhodan, German science fiction series
 Power Rangers, an American television franchise based on Super Sentai

Places
 PR postcode area, UK, including Preston and Lancashire
 Paraná (state), Brazil (ISO 3166-2:BR)
 Parma, Italy (ISO 3166-2:IT)
 Puerto Rico, ISO 3166 code PR

Politics
 Pakatan Rakyat, an informal Malaysian political coalition
 Party of Labour (Partija rada), a political party in Serbia
 Proportional representation, a property of some voting systems
 Republican Party of Albania, a political party in Albania

Public relations
 Public relations, the professional maintenance of a favorable public image by an organisation or person
 Press release, a prepared statement given to the news media as a public-relations tool

Religion
 Pastor, an ordained leader of a Christian congregation
 Permanent rector, or permanens rector, of a parish

Science, technology, and mathematics

Biology and medicine
 Partial Response, a component of Response Evaluation Criteria in Solid Tumors
 Pathogenesis-related proteins, produced by plants under pathogen attack
 Penicillium roqueforti
 Per rectum, meaning "administered rectally"
 Pigment red (e.g. Pigment Red 179, Pigment Red 190) or para red
 PR interval, a measurement used in cardiology
 PR-104
 Progesterone receptor, a protein

Computing
 PR, a complexity class
 pr, Unix command to paginate or columnate files for printing
 Adobe Premiere Pro, software which uses "Pr" as its icon abbreviation
 Pagerank, a Google technology
 Performance Rating, a computing term by AMD
 Project Reality, series of video games
 Pull request, part of distributed version control
 Part of the YPbPr standard

Mathematics
 PR (complexity), a complexity class
 Pr(E), also P(E), the probability of an event E
 Positive-real function, in mathematics
 Proportional representation, a property of some voting systems

Other uses in science and technology
 Praseodymium, symbol Pr, a chemical element
 Prandtl number, in physics and engineering, typically denoted Pr
 Propyl radicals or groups, denoted Pr in organic chemistry

Sports
 Personal record, an individual's best result in a particular event 
 Pinch runner, in baseball
 Protected ranking, a method of ranking tennis players coming back from injury
 Punt returner, a position in American football

Transportation
 Pakistan Railways (reporting mark PR)
 Park and ride, a type of car park with public transport connections
 Philippine Airlines (IATA airline designation PR)
 Poste restante, mail held for collection

Other uses
 Pakistan Rangers, a paramilitary force of Pakistan
 Parachute rigger, a former U.S. Navy rank
 Permanent residency
 Princess Royal (disambiguation)
 Professor

See also
 P&R (disambiguation)